Leadfield was an unincorporated community, and historic mining town in Inyo County, California. It is now a ghost town. It is located in Titus Canyon in the Grapevine Mountains, east of Death Valley in Death Valley National Park. It is on the National Register of Historic Places.

History

Ore was being exploited in Titus Canyon as early as 1905, but the townsite of Leadfield at the head of the canyon dates to the years 1925 and 1926. The product of extensive and fraudulent advertising by the Western Lead Mine Company and C.C. Julian, the town boomed in 1925. His advertising posters showed steamboats navigating the Amargosa River to Leadfield, ignoring the fact that the Amargosa River is dry much of the time and does not run within 20 miles of Leadfield.

Fifteen miles of road were built up the canyon to connect with the road to Beatty, Nevada, a concrete foundation for a stamp mill was poured, and the beginning of a series of power poles for electric lines were installed.

Historic photographs show some frame and corrugated metal buildings and there is evidence of a few dugouts, but the majority of the denizens of Leadfield lived in tents of varying sizes and construction. The population peaked at around 300 in 1926, with a post office opening in August of that year.  However, by February 1927, the post office closed down and the town died.

Julian disappeared and the inhabitants soon became disillusioned and quickly drifted away. The significance of the site lies in the fact it was an example of one of the get-rich-quick schemes of the wild 1920s.

Visiting
The remains of the town include a few rusted metal sheds and two locked, abandoned mine shafts, as of 2005. The town is reachable by one-way Titus Canyon Road at the eastern end of Titus Canyon, near Beatty, Nevada.

See also
Death Valley
List of ghost towns in California

References

External links 

Death Valley Ghost Towns

Ghost towns in Inyo County, California
Mining communities in California
Populated places in the Mojave Desert
Former settlements in Inyo County, California
Unincorporated communities in California
Historic districts on the National Register of Historic Places in California
National Register of Historic Places in Inyo County, California
National Register of Historic Places in Death Valley National Park
Populated places on the National Register of Historic Places in California